Vietnam War resisters in Sweden were Americans who fled to Sweden to avoid service in the Vietnam War between 1967 and 1973. Among the roughly 1,000 American exiles were around 800 military deserters and draft dodgers. Unlike other nations like Canada that discretely harbored Vietnam War resisters, the Swedish government granted war resisters asylum status and the public openly welcomed them. This unique acceptance and Swedish politicians' open protests against American involvement in the Vietnam War caused a rift in relations between the United States and Sweden.

History 

During the Vietnam War, 503,926 desertions occurred in the United States military. Most deserted in the United States, but some fled to other countries. During the war American servicemen were often stationed in or took retreats to Japan, and had trouble deserting while there due to the language barrier. Activists from the Japanese leftist group Beheiren devised a way to reach out to servicemen and assist them in deserting. Sweden became the target destination for deserters because it was the only Western country that openly granted asylum to Vietnam War deserters.

Sweden's granting of asylum to deserters worsened relations between Sweden and the United States. In 1969 the United States revoked its ambassador to Sweden in protest.

Of the roughly 1,000 American war resisters who came to Sweden, two-thirds were deserters rather than draft evaders. Very few stayed in Sweden for the rest of their lives, and the few who remained assimilated into Swedish society. Those who remained over the years typically did so because of a distaste for American politics or because of careers and family now in Sweden.

People

Deserters 
Most deserters reported their decision to desert was spontaneous. Around 100 black Americans deserted to come to Sweden, but had little plans to live for long in Sweden, and most eventually left the country. Many deserters had trouble navigating Swedish culture, guilt with abandoning their army compatriots, and had trouble keeping relationships with people in the United States, usually due to geographic distance or controversy from their decision to desert.

Draft evaders 

Draft evaders typically had an easier time adapting to Swedish life because unlike deserters, most were college educated and familiar with the anti-war movement. They also had fewer troubles finding ways to immigrate, unlike military deserters who had to escape from the U.S. military.

See also
 Opposition to United States involvement in the Vietnam War
 Sweden–United States relations
 Terry Whitmore

References

American refugees
Sweden–United States relations
Desertion
Draft evasion
Opposition to United States involvement in the Vietnam War
Political history of Sweden
Refugees in Sweden
Vietnam War draft evaders
Controversies in Sweden
Political controversies in the United States